Stick insects in New Zealand are found in a range of different environments, from cold high alpine areas to dry coastal bush. There are currently 23 different species described, from 10 genera . The most common species of the stick insect in New Zealand is the smooth stick insect (Clitarchus hookeri) .
Following , the New Zealand stick insects are placed into the subfamilies Phasmatinae (tribe: Acanthoxylini) and Pachymorphinae (tribe: Pachymorphinini).

This is a list of currently described stick insects in New Zealand:

Family Phasmatinae

Acanthoxyla 

Acanthoxyla fasciata 
Acanthoxyla geisoveii 
Acanthoxyla huttoni 
Acanthoxyla intermedia 
Acanthoxyla inermis 
Acanthoxyla prasina 
Acanthoxyla speciosa 
Acanthoxyla suteri

Argosarchus 

Argosarchus horridus

Clitarchus 

Clitarchus hookeri 
Clitarchus rakauwhakanekeneke 
Clitarchus tepaki

Pseudoclitarchus 

Pseudoclitarchus sentus

Tepakiphasma 

Tepakiphasma ngatikuri

Family Pachymorphinae

Asteliaphasma 

Asteliaphasma jucundum 
Asteliaphasma naomi

Micrarchus 

Micrarchus hystricuelus

Niveaphasma 

Niveaphasma annulata

Spinotectarchus 

Spinotectarchus acornutus

Tectarchus 

Tectarchus huttoni (Brunner 1907)
Tectarchus ovobessus 
Tectarchus salebrosus 
Tectarchus semilobatus

See also

Egg (phasmatodea)

References

 
 
 
 
 
 
 
 
 
 
 
 
 
 
 
 

Stick insects
New Zealand
.